The Glendale and Montrose Railway Company (G&M) was an interurban electrified railway in Southern California, in the United States. It was unique among the Los Angeles local railways, as it was among the area's only interurban line never absorbed into the expansive Pacific Electric system.

History
The railway began service from Glendale to Eagle Rock on March 13, 1909, as the Glendale and Eagle Rock Railway. Real estate developers in Montrose acquired the company in 1913 with the intent of extending the line to their newly constructed community. Cars first ran to Montrose on April 26, 1913 and then as far as La Crescenta later that year. The name was changed to the Glendale and Montrose Railway in 1914.

The tracks were widened to standard gauge in 1915, allowing interchanges with other railroads. A joint service was briefly established with the Pacific Electric, allowing cars originating in La Crescenta to run to the Pacific Electric Building via the Glendale–Burbank Line and interchange with the larger railroad's network. The service lasted less than a year, from October 1916 to the following September. In February 1924 the Glendale and Montrose trolleys traversed newly electrified Union Pacific (UP) tracks to reach Los Angeles. The city of Glendale contributed funding for the electrification to reduce the impact of steam trains through the town.

The population along the route in the early 1900s was too low to support frequent passenger service. The railway ceased operation at the end of 1930, and the Union Pacific took over the remaining tracks in 1931. A few years later, UP converted the ex-G&M trackage from electric to diesel. Tracks were connected to the Southern Pacific Coast Line in 1938 and freight trains continued to use the line, known as the Glendale branch, until November 1986. The Glendale Avenue segment was abandoned in 1956. Union Pacific abandoned the last remaining section of the railroad after 1991, and the right-of-way was subdivided and sold off.

Rolling stock
The company acquired three single-truck Birney cars in 1918. Initially sporting a red livery, the cars were given white accents in 1927 to differentiate them from Pacific Electric's Red Cars.

Preserved equipment
One of the electric locomotives of the Glendale & Montrose has been preserved in the collection of the Southern California Railway Museum. G&M No. 22, a 1923 Baldwin-Westinghouse boxcab locomotive, became UP No. E100 after Union Pacific acquired the G&M. In 1942, after UP ceased electric operation on the former G&M tracks, No. E100 was sold to a Union Pacific subsidiary in Washington, the Yakima Valley Transportation Company (YVT). It became YVT No. 297 and continued in use in Yakima for many years. When retired, in 1985, the locomotive was donated to the Orange Empire Railway Museum.

See also
 Streetcars in Los Angeles

References

External links
Glendale and Montrose Railway Company article by the Electric Railway Historical Association of California

History of Los Angeles
History of the San Fernando Valley
Defunct California railroads
Interurban railways in California
Transportation in Glendale, California
Railway lines opened in 1909
Railway services discontinued in 1930
Railway lines closed in 1991